Winslow High School is a four-year public high school located in Winslow, Maine, United States. Winslow serves the community of Winslow and is open to high school students from the towns of Vassalboro, Maine, and China, Maine (of Regional School Unit 18) at a tuition cost since there is no public high school in either town. It is a part of Winslow Public Schools.

It was a part of Kennebec Valley Consolidated Schools (AOS92) until July 1, 2018.

School Philosophy
As quoted by Winslow's former Principal Doug Carville, the school's "philosophy is to tailor education to meet the needs of each individual. We have a safe and friendly school climate where the administration, faculty and staff are committed to students of all ages".

Athletics
Winslow offers several freshmen, junior varsity, and varsity sports that students participate in throughout the school year.

Fall
 Boys Soccer
 Cheering
 Cross Country
 Field Hockey
 Football
 Girls Soccer
 Golf
Winter
 Boys Basketball
 Boys Ice Hockey
 Cheering
 Girls Basketball
 Girls Ice Hockey
 Indoor Track
 Swimming
 Unified Basketball
 Wrestling
Spring
 Baseball
 Softball
 Tennis
 Track and Field
 Boys and Girls Lacrosse

Extracurricular activities
In addition to offering sports, Winslow offers several extracurricular activities that students can take part it. These activities include, 
Fall Musical
Jazz Band
Math Team
National Honors Society
Theater Program
Anime Club
Pep Band
Renaissance
Service Club
One Act
Spring Play
Student Senate
Art Club
Philosophy Club
Yearbook Staff
Lettuce Club
The Economics classes also nominate the top eight performers to compete in the State Economics Meet, with the top four as the A Team, and the other four as the B Team.

Music students can also choose to participate in the annual Kennebec Valley Music Festival, All State Music Festival, or Jazz All State Music Festival through an audition, as well as the All State Music Festival in May.

The Cheerleaders set up the Homecoming Dance.
Sophomore students can choose to participate in setting up the Sadie Hawkins Dance, which that class pays for, while Juniors, whose class pays for the Prom, can choose to join the Prom Committee, which takes place in May.

School song
Sung to the tune of the American Navy's Song, Anchors Aweigh, Winslow's school song is,
Stand loyal to our school
Our Winslow High
We'll all unite and send our
Cheers up to the sky.
Stand back old (opposing team name ___)
Stand back or fall
We're coming down your way
And Winslow has possession of the ball.

Administration
Peter A. Thiboutot - Superintendent
Chad Bell - Principal
Richard Hendsbee - Assistant Principal
Jim Bourgoin - Athletic Director

Notable Alumni 

 Jamie Sears, American actor

Notes

External links
Winslow High School
Maine AOS 92 - Kennebec Valley Consolidated Schools
Former Maine School Union 52

Public high schools in Maine
Schools in Kennebec County, Maine
Winslow, Maine